Cremastocheilus retractus is a species of scarab beetle in the family Scarabaeidae.

Subspecies
These two subspecies belong to the species Cremastocheilus retractus:
 Cremastocheilus retractus incisus Casey, 1915
 Cremastocheilus retractus retractus LeConte, 1874

References

Further reading

 

Cetoniinae
Articles created by Qbugbot
Beetles described in 1874